Straight Creek Township is a township in Jackson County, Kansas, USA.  As of the 2000 census, its population was 158.

History
The territory of Straight Creek Township belonged to the Kickapoo Tribe in Kansas prior to 1869.

Geography
Straight Creek Township covers an area of 36.72 square miles (95.11 square kilometers); of this, 0.11 square miles (0.28 square kilometers) or 0.29 percent is water.

Adjacent townships
 Whiting Township (north)
 Grasshopper Township, Atchison County (northeast)
 Kapioma Township, Atchison County (east)
 Garfield Township (south)
 Franklin Township (southwest)
 Liberty Township (west)
 Netawaka Township (northwest)

Cemeteries
The township contains two cemeteries: Estes and Larkinburg.

References
 U.S. Board on Geographic Names (GNIS)
 United States Census Bureau cartographic boundary files

External links
 US-Counties.com
 City-Data.com

Townships in Jackson County, Kansas
Townships in Kansas